Galina Yuryevna Skiba (born 9 May 1984) is a Russian ice hockey forward. She most recently played with HC Tornado in the 2020–21 season of the Zhenskaya Hockey League (ZhHL).

International career
Skiba was selected for the Russian women's national ice hockey team in the 2006 and 2014 Winter Olympics. In 2006, she had one assist in five games, and in 2014, she played in all six games, scoring a pair of goals.

As of 2014, Skiba has also appeared for Russia at six IIHF Women's World Championships. Her first appearance came in 2005. She won a bronze medal as a part of the team in 2013 and 2016.

In December 2017, she and seven other Russian hockey players were sanctioned for doping and their results from the women's ice hockey tournament at the 2014 Winter Olympics were disqualified as part of the Oswald Commission. All of the sanctioned players appealed the decision and disqualifications were annulled in five cases; however, sanctions were upheld for Skiba, Inna Dyubanok, and Anna Shibanova.

Career statistics

International career
Through 2013–14 season

References

External links

1984 births
Sportspeople from Kharkiv
Living people
Olympic ice hockey players of Russia
Ice hockey players at the 2006 Winter Olympics
Ice hockey players at the 2014 Winter Olympics
Russian women's ice hockey forwards
Doping cases in ice hockey
Russian sportspeople in doping cases
Sportspeople banned for life
HC Tornado players